Thrikaripur railway station (code: TKQ) is a minor railway station in Kasaragod District, Kerala and falls under the Palakkad railway division of the Southern Railway zone, Indian Railways. It is 6 km away from Payyanur railway station and 36 km away from Kannur railway station.

References

Palakkad railway division
Railway stations in Kasaragod district
Cheruvathur area